Copelatus assimilis is a species of diving beetle. It is part of the genus Copelatus of the subfamily Copelatinae in the family Dytiscidae. It was described by Maurice Auguste Régimbart in 1985.

References

assimilis
Beetles described in 1985